Robert Tighe (or Teigh or Tyghe, sometimes misspelled Leigh), Deeping, Lincolnshire, (1562-1620) was an English cleric and linguist.

He was educated at both Oxford and Cambridge and served as Archdeacon of Middlesex (1602–1616) and Vicar of the Church of All Hallows, Barking, London. He left his son an unusually large estate of £1000 per annum. He was among the "First Westminster Company" charged by James I of England with the translation of the first 12 books of the King James Version of the Bible.

References

Bibliography

 McClure, Alexander. (1858) The Translators Revived: A Biographical Memoir of the Authors of the English Version of the Holy Bible. Mobile, Alabama: R. E. Publications (republished by the Marantha Bible Society, 1984 ASIN B0006YJPI8 )
 Nicolson, Adam. (2003) God's Secretaries: The Making of the King James Bible. New York: HarperCollins 

1620 deaths
People from the Deepings
17th-century English Anglican priests
Translators of the King James Version
Archdeacons of Middlesex
Year of birth unknown
Alumni of Trinity College, Cambridge